The Nova Scotia Home for Colored Children is an orphanage in Halifax, Nova Scotia that opened on June 6, 1921. It was built, because at the time, white home care institutions would not accept black children in need. In the 1960s segregation was coming to an end, and black people were being integrated into white institutions. In the present day, the building is used as a meeting place for community groups. The home came under fire when many former residents came forward with allegations of abuse they experienced during their time at the home, which ended in a class action lawsuit, an apology from the Premier of Nova Scotia and the establishment of an official Public Inquiry into the abuses at the Home.  The public inquiry, established under the Nova Scotia Public Inquiries Act was the first of its kind to take a restorative approach to its work.  The Restorative Inquiry for the Nova Scotia Home for Colored Children completed its work and released it final report "Journey to Light: A Different Way Forward - Final Report of the Restorative Inquiry - Nova Scotia Home for Colored Children"   (including 5 videos) in November 2019.

History
The home opened in Halifax, Nova Scotia on June 6, 1921, to accept black children in need of care who, at the time, were not permitted in white institutions. A crowd of 3000 spectators, the largest gathering of black Nova Scotians since 1783, celebrated the opening of the home. During the end of segregation and into the 1970s the home became an institution for children of all races and ethnic backgrounds. The home came under fire when many former residents reported physical and sexual abuse they suffered during their time at the home. On October 10, 2014, the premier of Nova Scotia, Stephen McNeil, gave an apology to those who suffered due to the Nova Scotia Home for Colored Children. A class action lawsuit with the province of Nova Scotia was settled in July 2014, which awarded approximately 300 former residents $29 million on top of $5 million settled in the summer of 2013 with the Nova Scotia Home for Colored Children. The former schoolhouse is now used as a meeting place for local community groups.

The Restorative Inquiry Report provided the first accurate history of the Home contained in Chapter 3 of the Final Report. It collected relevant evidence and documentation that is now available at the Nova Scotia Provincial Archives.

In 2006, author, teacher, artist and community activist Delvina Bernard, whose father had grown up in the home, contributed a piece of wood from the building to the Six String Nation project. Parts of that material are used as a finger brace and a reinforcing strip on the interior of Voyageur, the guitar at the heart of the project.

Apology
An official apology was made in the provincial legislature by the Premier to the former residents and community leaders of the Nova Scotia Home for Colored Children. Premier Stephen McNeill apologised for the mistreatment, mental, psychological and sexual abuse inflicted on the orphans by staff members for almost a 50-year period. This abuse was discontinued in the 1980s. McNeil noted that this was one of the most horrific events that took place in the province and the cries of the people fell on deaf ears for so long. McNeil also noted that he is thankful to the former residents for their courage and ability to share their stories and bring awareness and inspiration to other African Nova Scotia communities, and all Nova Scotians.

Tony Smith, a former resident of the Nova Scotia Home for Colored Children, was thankful to the persons who advocated for many years to bring awareness of the abuse and mistreatment that the blacks received, and this took a lot of time, effort and energy to bring this project together and now people are becoming aware. Tony Smith has been ordained by his friends and co-workers to be their “voice”, and bring awareness throughout the community. This is only the tip of the iceberg though, persons need to be aware of what really happened why it happened and how the overall decisions affected Black Nova Scotians. Due to these issue racism and inequality will continue for generations until there are put to a stop. An implementation of a process that will not bring further harm to the already open wound, should implore all voices that want to be heard, and potential build healthy relationships with one another in-order to live in peace and harmony.

Theoretical perspective

Understanding the reason for the existence of the Nova Scotia Home for Colored Children stems from the history of racism and racial segregation in Nova Scotia as well as Canada. There are infamous cases of segregation related issues in Nova Scotia and Canada, such as Viola Desmond, the historic treatment of Chinese immigrants, the placement of Japanese Canadians in internment camps during World War II, and the historic and contemporary treatment of the indigenous population. Segregation on the basis of race is rooted in the belief that there are distinct differences between people of different skin colors. Majority of anthropologists and biologists have abandoned the notion of racial categories and any attempts to prove the existence of race on a biological level. Social scientists have come to understand race as a social construct, forming from what is called racial formation. This formation of the concept of race creates a separation between those in power, white people, and those subjugated to said power, persons of color, and an exclusion of persons of color from aspects of society. Those that produce the knowledge and determine what is moral in society are part of the traditional power holding white culture. The racial knowledge created by these knowledge producers aids in the creation and maintenance of the concept of the other. Racial knowledge establishes an understanding of what it means to be the other, a specific set of behaviors, guiding ideas and ideologies of otherness. This concept of the other denies autonomy to those labeled as such and extends power, control, authority, domination over them.

References

Anti-black racism in Canada
Communities in Halifax, Nova Scotia
History of Nova Scotia by location
Black Canadian settlements